Abdelaziz Tawfik Mohamed Hassan (born 24 May 1986) is an Egyptian former footballer played as a midfielder.

Tawfik played in the 2005 FIFA World Youth Championship in the Netherlands.
He is the elder brother of Egyptian Premier League footballers Ahmed Tawfik of Pyramids and Akram Tawfik of Al Ahly.

Club career
Tawfik's good spell at El Mansoura convinced ENPPI to lay an offer to win his services, although he was of little to no significance. The young midfielder quickly established himself in his new club and as a result joined the Egypt national football team. His good performances did not go unnoticed in Europe. Then he transferred to Al-Masry since the beginning of season (2011–2012).

References

External links

Abdelaziz Tawfik at Footballdatabase

1986 births
Living people
Association football midfielders
Egyptian footballers
Egypt international footballers
2009 FIFA Confederations Cup players
2010 Africa Cup of Nations players
Egyptian Premier League players
Footballers from Cairo
El Mansoura SC players
ENPPI SC players
Al Masry SC players
Smouha SC players
Tala'ea El Gaish SC players
Ghazl El Mahalla SC players